Puhăceni is a commune and village in the Anenii Noi district of Moldova.

References

Communes of Anenii Noi District
Populated places on the Dniester